Jashumben Savjibhai Korat alias Jashumatiben (born 27 July, 1959) is an Indian politician and a former Minister for Women and Child Welfare of Gujarat state. She was a member of the Gujarat Legislative Assembly from 1999 to 2012. She is associated with the Bharatiya Janata Party.

Biography
She was born into a farmer's family in an Indian village near Junagadh. She entered politics and was elected to the Gujarat Legislative Assembly in a by-election after sudden death of her husband, Savjibhai Korat, in 1999, as the Bharatiya Janata Party (BJP) candidate. She was a Member of Legislative Assembly from Jetpur constituency. In 2001, she was appointed the State Minister for Women and Child Welfare. In 2002 Gujarat legislative assembly election, she was reelected from Jetpur constituency. In 2005, she was again appointed the State Minister for Women and Child Welfare. In 2007 election, she was reelected to the 12th legislative assembly from Jetpur constituency. She continued to serve as the Minister until 2008.

References

1959 births
Living people
Women in Gujarat politics
People from Junagadh district
Gujarat MLAs 2002–2007
Gujarat MLAs 2007–2012
21st-century Indian women politicians
21st-century Indian politicians
Bharatiya Janata Party politicians from Gujarat
Gujarat MLAs 1998–2002
20th-century Indian women
20th-century Indian people